Goosetown may refer to:

A nickname of Upper Nyack, New York
Goosetown: Reconstructing an Akron Neighborhood, a book by Joyce Dyer
Goosetown, a fictional town in Duck universe